One Kiss is a 2016 Italian film, directed by Ivan Cotroneo and based on the novel of the same name, written by him and published in 2010 by Bompiani. The film's main themes are homophobia and bullying in schools.

Plot

Antonio is a basketball player in a high school team, a rising star, but it doesn't make him popular in his school, which is in a small northern Italian town. He is a closeted kid, spending most of the time silent and grieving over his older brother's death. Most of his teammates consider him dumb. Blu is a sharp and smart girl, who, after being discovered to have had sex with her boyfriend and three of his friends at the same time, is fighting with graffiti that is sprayed on the school walls, which calls her a slut. The new kid, Lorenzo, is openly gay. He has just been adopted from an orphanage in Turin and guards himself with extravagant behaviour and an extreme sense of fashion. The three teenagers start an unusual, but good friendship, fighting against bullying schoolmates with immense success. But, then, one single kiss changes their future, leading to a great tragedy.

Cast
 Rimau Grillo Ritzberger as Lorenzo
 Valentina Romani as Blu
 Leonardo Pazzagli as Antonio
 Simonetta Solder as Blu's mother
 Giorgio Marchesi as Blu's father
 Thomas Trabacchi as Lorenzo's father
 Susy Laude as Lorenzo's mother
 Laura Mazzi as Antonio's mother
 Sergio Romano as Antonio's father  
 Alessandro Sperduti

Release

Film festivals
 Seattle International Film Festival. 31 May 2016.
 Tel Aviv International LGBT Film Festival. 7 June 2016.

Awards and nominations
 Nastro d'Argento. 2016.
 Guglielmo Biraghi Award. for Rimau Grillo Ritzberger, Valentina Romani, Leonardo Pazzagli and Alessandro Sperduti.

References

External links
 
 

Italian LGBT-related films